Alberto Cotta Ramusino (born 8 May 1995), known professionally as Tananai, is an Italian singer-songwriter, rapper and record producer.

Biography 
Ramusino was born in Milan. His music career began in 2017, when he obtained a recording contract with the label Universal Music Italia, with whom he released his debut studio album To Discover and Forget under the pseudonym Not For Us.

After the publication of the first album, the artist began to perform under the pseudonym Tananai and began to work mainly on the musical production of songs in Italian. In 2019, he released the singles "Volersi male", "Bear Grylls", "Ichnusa" and "Calcutta". In January 2020, he released "Giugno", a single that anticipated the release of the debut EP entitled Piccoli boati, out on 21 February.

In March 2021, Tananai released the single "Baby Goddamn", which went viral on Spotify, followed by the single "Maleducazione" and the track "Le madri degli altri", included in the album Disumano by Italian rapper Fedez.

Tananai placed second during the show, with his entry "Esagerata", rightfully accessing the festival in the  category. "Sesso occasionale" was later announced as his entry for the Sanremo Music Festival 2022.

On 4 December 2022, it was officially announced once again his participation in the Sanremo Music Festival. "Tango" was later announced as his entry for the Sanremo Music Festival 2023.

Discography

Studio albums

Extended plays

Singles

Other charted songs

Guest appearances

References 

Italian singer-songwriters
Living people
21st-century Italian singers
1995 births
Singers from Milan